Ooz or OOZ may refer to:

 Out of zone plays made, a baseball statistic
 OOZ, a work by artist Natalie Jeremijenko
 Ooz, a character in the Japanese Kamen Rider OOO TV series
 The Ooz, a 2017 album by King Krule

See also 
 Ooze (disambiguation)
 Ouse (disambiguation)